{{DISPLAYTITLE:Gδ set}}
In the mathematical field of topology, a Gδ set is a subset of a topological space that is a countable intersection of open sets.
Historically Gδ sets were also called inner limiting sets, but that terminology is not in use anymore.
Gδ sets, and their dual, F sets, are the second level of the Borel hierarchy.

Definition

In a topological space a Gδ set is a countable intersection of open sets. The Gδ sets are exactly the level Π sets of the Borel hierarchy.

Examples

 Any open set is trivially a Gδ set.
 The irrational numbers are a Gδ set in the real numbers . They can be written as the countable intersection of the open sets  (the superscript denoting the complement) where  is rational.
However, the construction above gave the irrational numbers as a countable intersection of open dense subsets.
 The continuity set of any real valued function is a Gδ subset of its domain (see the "Properties" section for a more general statement).
 The set of functions in  not differentiable at any point within  contains a dense Gδ subset of the metric space . (See .)

Properties

The notion of Gδ sets in metric (and topological) spaces is related to the notion of completeness of the metric space as well as to the Baire category theorem.  See the result about completely metrizable spaces in the list of properties below.   sets and their complements are also of importance in real analysis, especially measure theory.

Basic properties 
 The complement of a Gδ set is an Fσ set, and vice versa.
 The intersection of countably many Gδ sets is a Gδ set.
 The union of  many Gδ sets is a Gδ set.
 A countable union of Gδ sets (which would be called a Gδσ set) is not a Gδ set in general.
 In a topological space, the zero set of every real valued continuous function  is a (closed) Gδ set, since  is the intersection of the open sets , .
 In a metrizable space, every closed set is a Gδ set and, dually, every open set is an Fσ set.  Indeed, a closed set  is the zero set of the continuous function , where  indicates the distance from a point to a set.  The same holds in pseudometrizable spaces.
 In a first countable T1 space, every singleton is a Gδ set.
This follows from the previous result about completely metrizable subspaces and the fact that every subspace of a separable metric space is separable.
 A topological space  is Polish if and only if it is homeomorphic to a Gδ subset of a compact metric space.

Continuity set of real valued functions 

The set of points where a function  from a topological space to a metric space is continuous is a  set. As a consequence, while it is possible for the irrationals to be the set of continuity points of a function (see the popcorn function), it is impossible to construct a function that is continuous only on the rational numbers.

Gδ space

A Gδ space is a topological space in which every closed set is a Gδ set . A normal space that is also a Gδ space is called perfectly normal.  For example, every metrizable space is perfectly normal.

See also 

 Fσ set, the dual concept; note that "G" is German (Gebiet) and "F" is French (fermé).
 P-space, any space having the property that every Gδ set is open

Notes

References

 
 
 
 
 
 

General topology
Descriptive set theory